The 2019 Nigeria Women's Cup (known as the 2019 AITEO Women's Cup for sponsorship reasons) was the 26th edition of the Nigeria Women's Cup, the main single-elimination women's football tournament in Nigeria.

The defending champions were Rivers Angels, after they defeated Ibom Angels in the previous final.

Twenty-one teams contested the trophy, with seven teams receiving byes to the second round.

Schedule

The rounds of the 2019 competition were scheduled as follows:

Matches
A total of twenty-three matches were played, starting with the first round on 12 June 2019 and culminating with the final on 28 July 2019 at the Ahmadu Bello Stadium, Kaduna.

First round
Eight matches were played on 12 and 13 June 2019. Rivers Angels, Adamawa Queens, Sunshine Queens, Delta Queens, Nasarawa Amazons, Confluence Queens and Ibom Angels all received byes to the second round.

|}

Second round
Eight matches were played on 20 and 27 June 2019. The nine first round winners joined the seven teams who received byes to the second round.

|}

Quarter-finals
The eight winners of the second round played against each other, the matches were played on 30 June and 1 July 2019.

|}

Semi-finals
The two matches took place on 5 July 2019 at neutral venues.

Final

Notes

References

External links
Nigeria 2019 at RSSF. com

2018–19 in Nigerian football
Women's cup